The following are some of the notable adaptations of the Robin Hood story in film and television.

Robin Hood, English-language live-action films and television series

Theatrical shorts
1908: Robin Hood and His Merry Men, a silent film directed by Percy Stow, and the first appearance of Robin Hood on the screen.
1912: Robin Hood, a silent film starring Robert Frazer as Robin Hood.
1912: Robin Hood Outlawed, a British silent film starring A. Brian Plant as Robin Hood.
1913: Robin Hood, a silent film starring William Russell as Robin Hood.
1913: In the Days of Robin Hood, a British short film starring Harry Agar Lyons as Robin Hood.

Theatrical features
1922: Robin Hood, a silent film starring Douglas Fairbanks.
1938: The Adventures of Robin Hood, starring Errol Flynn as Robin Hood, his most acclaimed role, with Olivia de Havilland as Maid Marian, Eugene Pallette as Friar Tuck, Alan Hale, Sr. as Little John, Basil Rathbone as Guy of Gisborne, Claude Rains as Prince John, Patric Knowles as Will Scarlet, Melville Cooper as the Sheriff of Nottingham, and Ian Hunter as Richard I of England. Considered by many to be the best Robin Hood movie.
1946: The Bandit of Sherwood Forest, a film starring Cornel Wilde as Robert of Nottingham, Robin Hood's son; Robin Hood was Russell Hicks.
1948: The Prince of Thieves, a film starring Jon Hall as Robin Hood.
1950: Rogues of Sherwood Forest, a film starring John Derek as Robin Hood's son, Robin of Huntington.
1951: Tales of Robin Hood, a Robert Lippert film with Robert Clarke as Robin Hood
1952: The Story of Robin Hood and His Merrie Men, a feature from Walt Disney, starring Richard Todd as Robin, Joan Rice as Marian, Peter Finch as the Sheriff of Nottingham, James Hayter as Friar Tuck, James Robertson Justice as Little John, Hubert Gregg as Prince John, Elton Hayes as Alan-a-Dale, Anthony Forwood as Will Scarlet, as Patrick Barr as King Richard. 
1954: The Men of Sherwood Forest, a Hammer Films feature starring Don Taylor as Robin.
1958: The Son of Robin Hood, where the 'son' of Robin Hood, is actually his daughter, played by June Laverick.
1960 Sword of Sherwood Forest, a Hammer version, Richard Greene reprising his television role.
1967: A Challenge for Robin Hood, a Hammer version, with Barrie Ingham as Robin Hood.
1969: Wolfshead: The Legend of Robin Hood a Hammer version.
1973: Robin Hood an animated adaptation that was also produced by Walt Disney Productions.
1976:  Robin and Marian starring Sean Connery as Robin, Audrey Hepburn as Maid Marian, Nichol Williamson as Little John and Ronnie Barker as Friar Tuck.
1991: Robin Hood: Prince of Thieves, starring Kevin Costner as Robin, Mary Elizabeth Mastrantonio as Marian, Christian Slater as Will Scarlet, Alan Rickman as the Sheriff of Nottingham, Mike McShane as Friar Tuck, Nick Brimble as Little John, and Michael Wincott as Guy of Gisbourne, with Sean Connery appearing as King Richard in the finale.
1991: Robin Hood, starring Patrick Bergin and Uma Thurman, is a reinvention of the story pitting Robin Hood against different antagonists. The film was released theatrically in Europe, Australia and Japan, and on television on the Fox network in the United States and in South America. 
1993: Robin Hood: Men in Tights, a film by Mel Brooks that spoofs both the 1938 and the 1991 films and recycles bits from his short-lived late-1975 Robin Hood TV sitcom When Things Were Rotten. Cary Elwes plays Robin in the movie. Richard Lewis plays Prince John while Roger Rees plays the Sheriff of Nottingham. Amy Yasbeck plays Marian, Eric Alan Kramer is Little John, and Matthew Porretta is Will Scarlet. Patrick Stewart appears in the ending, spoofing Sean Connery's take on King Richard.
2010: Robin Hood, a film directed by Ridley Scott and starring Russell Crowe as Robin, Cate Blanchett as Marian, Oscar Isaac as Prince John, Danny Huston as King Richard, Mark Addy as Friar Tuck, Matthew Macfadyen as the Sheriff of Nottingham, Kevin Durand as Little John, Scott Grimes as Will Scarlet, and Alan Doyle as Alan-a-Dale.
2018: Robin Hood, a film directed by Otto Bathurst previously titled Robin Hood: Origins, starring Taron Egerton as Robin, Jamie Foxx as Little John, Ben Mendelsohn as the Sheriff of Nottingham, Eve Hewson as Marian, Tim Minchin as Friar Tuck, Jamie Dornan as Will Scarlet, and Paul Anderson as Guy of Gisborne

Direct-to-video features
1994: Robin Hood: Prince of Sherwood, starring Jason Braly as Robin Hood
2007: Splitting the Arrow. Sometime in the 12th Century, a documentary crew entered Sherwood Forest in search of a legend. This is what followed. Calvert Tooley plays Robin Hood.
2018: Robin Hood: The Rebellion, a film directed by Nicholas Winter.

Television films
1968: The Legend of Robin Hood, a 90-minute American television musical, featuring the songs of Sammy Cahn and Jimmy Van Heusen. Starring David Watson as Robin Hood, and Douglas Fairbanks Jr. as King Richard.
1975: Robin Hood Junior, starring Keith Chegwin as a young Robin. This was spun off into a short series The Unbroken Arrow, in 1976 with different actors.
1984: The Zany Adventures of Robin Hood, a made-for-TV spoof starring George Segal (Robin), Morgan Fairchild (Marian) and Roddy McDowall (Prince John).
2001: Princess of Thieves, a Disney-produced American made-for-TV movie, starred Keira Knightley as Robin Hood's (Stuart Wilson) heroic adolescent daughter, Gwyn, who takes over her father's role and comes to his rescue.
2009: Beyond Sherwood Forest, a TV movie starring Robin Dunne as Robin Hood and Erica Durance as Maid Marian
2022: The Adventures of Maid Marian. A TV movie focusing on Maid Marian (Sophie Craig), with Dominic Andersen playing  Robin Hood.

Television series
1953: Robin Hood a television series on BBC Television, featured Patrick Troughton, in the first representation of Robin Hood on television.
1955–1959: The Adventures of Robin Hood, a long-running British series starring Richard Greene that is also remembered for its catchy theme tune.
1955: Robin Hood, the Movie (compilation from the Richard Greene TV series) (1991 release, according to some sources)
1956: Robin Hood's Greatest Adventures (also starring Donald Pleasence as Prince John) (compilation from the Richard Greene TV series) (1991 release, according to some sources)
1958: Robin Hood: The Quest for the Crown (compilation from the Richard Greene TV series) (1991 or 1995 release, according to some sources)
1975: The Legend of Robin Hood, a six-episode BBC miniseries starring Martin Potter in the title role, Paul Darrow as the Sheriff of Nottingham and Diane Keen as Lady Marion. The adaptation was aired on public television in the USA later in the 1970s.
1975: When Things Were Rotten, a comedy TV series produced by Mel Brooks and starring Richard Gautier (as an imbecilic Robin Hood), Bernie Kopell and Misty Rowe.
1984–1986: Robin of Sherwood, a fantasy-style British television series starring Michael Praed and later Jason Connery as Robin. The series set the template for many of the adaptations that followed, most notably the introduction of a Saracen (Muslim) outlaw and the move to a grittier tone.
1989–1994: Maid Marian and her Merry Men, a British children's TV show, rewrote the legend somewhat, with Marian as the dynamic leader of the resistance against Prince John, Robin as her thick-headed, cowardly, buffoonish figurehead, and Nottingham as John's put-upon, sarcastic enforcer.
1997–1998: The New Adventures of Robin Hood, a French–U.S. TV series, starred Matthew Porretta as a black-leather-clad Robin in the first two seasons and John Bradley taking over the lead role in the final two seasons. The tone of the series resembled its contemporaries Hercules: The Legendary Journeys and Xena: Warrior Princess. Porretta had appeared as Will Scarlet O'Hara in Men in Tights.
2006–2009: Robin Hood, a BBC One television series was produced by Tiger Aspect. It was first broadcast as thirteen-episode series in the UK from October to December 2006, with a second series following in 2007, and third in 2009. Jonas Armstrong stars in the title role.

Robin Hood in Ivanhoe, English-language live-action films and television series 
Ivanhoe: A Romance by Walter Scott is an historical novel published in three volumes, in 1819, proved to be one of the best-known and most influential of Scott's novels, so much it influenced popular perceptions of Robin Hood. The following adaptions of the novel are known to feature Robin Hood:

Theatrical features
1913: Ivanhoe, featuring Walter Thomas as Robin Hood.
1952: Ivanhoe, a film featuring Harold Warrender as Locksley (Robin Hood).

Television films
1982: Ivanhoe, TV film with Robin Hood played by David Robb.

Television series
1958-1959: Ivanhoe, TV series starring Roger Moore as Ivanhoe. Features Emerton Court as "Sir Robert" in the episode "Arms and the Women".
1997: Ivanhoe, a TV mini-series featuring Aden Gillett as Robin of Locksley.

Robin Hood–themed parodies, English-language live-action films and television series 
Since Robin Hood is a character in the public domain, there is no restriction on his use. Thus, he has often appeared in other films and TV series that do not revolve around the legend in strictest terms, and some other characters have played a Robin Hood-like role. or be an In others Robin Hood is interactive with other characters that originate in other TV shows and films.

Theatrical features and serials 
 1939: Mexicali Rose''' is an American Western film directed by George Sherman and starring Gene Autry, Smiley Burnette, and Noah Beery. Based on a story by Luci Ward and Connie Lee
 1946: Son of the Guardsman is a serial with a period setting, in this case 12th century England.  The serial is largely based on the Robin Hood legends, to the extent of including outlaws from Sherwood Forest, but it does not include or reference Robin Hood himself.
1952: Miss Robin Hood, a British film starring Margaret Rutherford as a modern-day female Robin Hood.
1963: Siege of the Saxons, a British Arthurian film starring Janette Scott as Princess Katherine (King Arthur's daughter) and Ronald Lewis as Robert Marshall, a thieving archer who proclaims he only steals from the rich. The two go on the run as outlaws and fall in love after the evil Edmund of Cornwall attempts to usurp Arthur's throne after his death.
1964: Robin and the 7 Hoods, a musical film set in 1930s gangster Chicago, with Frank Sinatra as "Robbo".
1971: Up the Chastity Belt, starring Frankie Howerd, with Hugh Paddick as Robin Hood.
1981: Time Bandits, starring John Cleese, Sean Connery, Shelley Duvall; written and directed by Terry Gilliam had a short spoof of the Robin Hood legend, with Robin (played by Cleese) being portrayed as an upper class twit and as a parody of Charles, Prince of Wales.

Television series
1963: "Opie and His Merry Men", an episode of The Andy Griffith Show: A hobo tells Opie Taylor and his friends stories about Robin Hood and encourages them to emulate him.
1966: Art Carney played the supervillain The Archer, who was based on Robin Hood, in season 2 of Batman ("Shoot a Crooked Arrow" and "Walk the Straight and Narrow", 1966).
1968: In The Time Tunnel episode "The Revenge of Robin Hood", the former outlaw is the Earl of Huntington who gets King John to sign the Magna Carta.
1970: A 1970s Muppet skit from Sesame Street featured Ernie as Robin Hood, auditioning new recruits for his Merry Men, including Harvey Kneeslapper.
1970: The Muppet Show did their version of Robin Hood for one episode with Kermit the Frog as the titular character, Fozzie Bear as Little John, Gonzo the Great as the Sheriff of Nottingham with guest star Lynn Redgrave as Maid Marian. The show takes an unusual twist mid-way when Miss Piggy, jealous that Redgrave is the leading lady instead of her (gets a consolation role as "Sister Tuck" as opposed to Friar Tuck), kidnaps her, locks her up in her dressing room and unsuccessfully takes her place during the rescue scene, to which Kermit and his Merry Men end up saving the real Maid Marian (Lynn Redgrave).
1973: Dennis Moore is a sketch that appears in "Dennis Moore," the thirty-seventh episode of Monty Python's Flying Circus. Dennis Moore is a Highwayman who steals 'Lupins' from the rich and gives them to the poor, once the rich become poor and the poor become rich and pompous, he steals the 'lupins' from the poor, returning them to the rich.
The melody for the Dennis Moore song is taken from a song originally about Robin Hood ("Robin Hood, Robin Hood, Riding through the glen..."). 
1982: Voyagers! (TV series) (Episode 10 "An Arrow Pointing East" aired 12 December 1982) Voyagers Jon-Erik Hexum (Phineas Bogg) and Meeno Peluce (Jeffrey Jones) help Robin Hood played by Dan Hamilton sneak into an archery competition to rescue Maid Marian.
1991: Star Trek: The Next Generation episode "Qpid" features the crew being forced to play out a real-Robin Hood tale (Captain Picard, played by Patrick Stewart, as Robin Hood) when Q recreates it.
1995: The Sliders episode "Prince of Wails" is set in an alternate history where Great Britain successfully suppressed the American Revolution. The plot of the episode broadly follows the story of Robin Hood, with the British States of America being a heavily taxed and oppressed corner of the British Empire, the villain (an alternate version of Maximillian Arturo) being styled as the Sheriff of San Francisco but serving as a viceroy, and Quinn Mallory and the revolutionary Oakland Raiders serving as Robin Hood and his Merry Men (particularly after adopting the tactic of stealing from the rich and giving to the poor).
1996: Wishbone plays Robin Hood in the episode "Paw Prints of Thieves", to portray Joe's fight to give leftover food to a homeless shelter, even if it is against regulations.
1996: Robin of Locksley, a made-for-TV movie starring Devon Sawa as a modern teenage Robin attending a prep school with the snobbish John Prince, played by Joshua Jackson. Set in modern times.
1999: The Blackadder Millennium Special Back & Forth featured Robin Hood much like the recurring character Lord Flashheart, with similar boisterous personas and played by the same actor (Rik Mayall), with Kate Moss as Maid Marian. In his role, he proclaims his Merry Men have "strong muscle tone and are not gay!" though his Merry Men later betray and kill him after a time-travelling Blackadder convinced them that their purpose of stealing from the rich and giving to the poor is ultimately pathetic.
1999: Back to Sherwood, a children's series featuring a teenage descendant of Robin ("Robyn Hood") who discovers she has the power to travel back in time, and joins with the children of her ancestor's band (Joan Little, Phil Scarlet, etc.).
2005: Charmed episode 7.14, "Carpe Demon", an ex-demon named Drake uses his powers to turn himself and the sisters into Robin Hood, Maid Marion, and Robin's merry men. A sorcerer casts a spell on Drake making him believe that he is Robin Hood and that Phoebe is Maid Marion.
 2007: Chucklevision episode 19.6 "Sherwood Chuckle": the Chuckle Brothers join Robin Hood and his merry men and set out to save Maid Marion from the Sheriff of Nottingham. 
2001–2006: Last of the Summer Wine: Billy Hardcastle often claims himself as being a 'direct descendant of Robin Hood'.
2011–2018: Once Upon a Time, an ABC television series based on major Disney animated films. Robin Hood appears as a recurring character, where he is played first by Tom Ellis in Season Two and later Sean Maguire starting in Season Three. In Season Six, Maguire plays a different version of the character who follows Regina home from a fantasy world.
2013: In Once Upon a Time in Wonderland: Robin Hood (played as above by Maguire) appears in the "Forget Me Not" episode of the series in which Will Scarlett joins the Merry Men. Scarlett is the real name of "The Knave", a lead character in the Wonderland series.
2013: Series 3 of Gigglebiz introduced Will Singalot (played by Justin Fletcher like many other characters in the series) who was the minstrel of Robin Hood (played by Tom Golding). Will would always constantly sing and spoil Robin's plans to impress Maid Marian (played by Ellie Kirk).
2014: In Doctor Who, Robin Hood appears in the third episode of eighth series, "Robot of Sherwood" by Mark Gatiss, played by actor Tom Riley.
2015: Though never having made an appearance, Robin Hood is mentioned in the Arrowverse. He is one of the inspirations that is adopted by Oliver Queen for which he becomes the vigilante Green Arrow in the superhero television series Arrow. In the related series, The Flash, antagonist Vandal Savage mentions that he trained Robin Hood to become the professional archer that he was known as.

Abandoned projects
In 2010 Lana and Lilly Wachowski announced their intention to direct the film Hood, a modern adaptation of the Robin Hood legend.
In 2014 Disney were developing a Robin Hood movie provisionally titled Nottingham & Hood, with first time screenwriter Brandon Barker writing, and a tone similar to the Pirates of the Caribbean film series. The hope was to launch a new adventure franchise that fit Disney's global brand.
Also in 2014, Sony Pictures mooted the idea of building a shared universe based on various characters from the Robin Hood mythos, spinning off Merry Men like Will Scarlett and Little John into their own separate films.

Robin Hood - Musicals
"Arrow: The Legend of Robin Hood" was a musical production made by the Stage Musicals Group at the Alameda Open Air Theatre in Gibraltar from 23 June 2003 to 30 June 2003.  It was directed by one of its writers, Mr. Trevor Galliano.

Robin Hood, English-language animated films and television series

Theatrical shorts
1939: Robin Hood Makes Good, a Chuck Jones animated cartoon.
1948: Robin Hood-Winked, an animated cartoon with Popeye.
1949: Rabbit Hood, a Chuck Jones animated cartoon with Bugs Bunny and footage of Errol Flynn.
1949: Robin Hoodlum A UPA cartoon starring Fox and Crow with the Fox as Robin Hood, and the Crow as Sheriff is hence man.
1958: Robin Hood Daffy, a Chuck Jones animated cartoon in which Daffy Duck believes he is Robin Hood and tries unsuccessfully to convince an unbelieving Porky Pig (himself dressed like Friar Tuck).
1958: Robin Hoodwinked, an animated cartoon with Tom and Jerry.
1962: "Not in Nottingham", featuring Loopy de Loop and Robin Hood.
1968: Pinkcome Tax, a DePatie-Freleng Enterprises cartoon directed by Arthur Davis and starring the Pink Panther, who takes on the role of a Merry Man, and unsuccessfully tries to free an imprisoned peasant (played by the Panther's recurring foil, The Little Man) who is locked up for being too poor to pay his taxes. After both of them wind up in the dungeon, they get a letter from Robin Hood who promises to save them, only for Robin to be jailed as well.

Theatrical features
1973: Robin Hood, a Walt Disney production, which had the various characters depicted as anthropomorphic animal characters, including Robin Hood and Maid Marian as foxes.
2001: Robin Hood (credited as "Monsieur Hood" and voiced by Vincent Cassel) and the Merry Men make a brief appearance as unwelcome rescuers in the movie version of William Steig's Shrek. Here, they speak with French accents, partake in Irish step-dancing, and are defeated by Princess Fiona. The Latin American dub depicts Robin Hood commanding the Musketeers.

Direct-to-video features
2012: Tom and Jerry: Robin Hood and His Merry Mouse, a film released in October 2012 starring Tom and Jerry.

Animated television films
1972: The Adventures of Robin Hoodnik, a TV movie produced by Hanna-Barbera whose all-animal cast predates the Disney version by one year.
1986: Ivanhoe, animated TV movie with Robert Coleby providing the voice of Robin Hood.
1988: Storybook Classics - The Adventures Of Robin Hood, animated. Burbank Films Australias
2007: Robin Hood: Quest for the King, animated TV film, with antrophomorphed characters. Produced by BKN
2012: Robin Good and His Not-So-Merry Men, a VeggieTales TV film released in spring 2012.

Television series
1959: "Robin Hood Yogi", a Yogi Bear short from The Huckleberry Hound Show.
1959: "Nottingham and Yeggs", a Huckleberry Hound short from The Huckleberry Hound Show.
1960: "Robin Hood", an episode of Peabody's Improbable History.
1964: "Robin Hood", a four-part episode of The Famous Adventures of Mr. Magoo, featuring Mr. Magoo in the role of Friar Tuck.
1967: Rocket Robin Hood, a space-age version of the Robin Hood legend, where he and his band of Merry Spacemen live in the year 3000 on Sherwood Asteroid and fight the evil Sheriff who rules the space territory of N.O.T.T. (Trillium / Steve Krantz Production)
1982: In The Smurfs cartoon series, there was a second-season episode titled "The Adventures of Robin Smurf", where Vanity Smurf took the role of Robin Hood and Smurfette was Maid Marian.
1984: Danger Mouse launched their sixth season of the show with a spoof titled "Once Upon A Timeslip", in which the narrator discovered his voice controlled the on-screen antics, and who then put Danger Mouse and his assistant Penfold through a comic adventure as Robin Hood and Little John.
1988: ALF Tales, has an episode called "Robin Hood", where the cast fights for the right to promote their swing band, Ye Merry Men.
1989: Robin Hood was parodied in an episode of The Super Mario Bros. Super Show! as Hooded Robin, an Albatoss who can imitate anyone's voice, and helped the young Mushroom Peoples of Sharewood Village against the Sheriff of Koopingham.
1990: A Garfield and Friends episode was called "Robin Hog", a U.S. Acres where Orson fantasizes himself as Robin Hog.
1990: The Tiny Toon Adventures episode "Weirdest Story Ever Told" featured a segment titled "Robin Hare". This version featured Buster as the title character and Montana Max as the "Sheriff of Naughty Ham". A book loosely based on the episode was also released, possibly as "Buster Hood".
1991: The episode of Captain N: The Game Master "Misadventures in Robin Hood Woods" had the heroes from the show aid Robin in defeating Prince John and rescuing Maid Marian.
1991: Young Robin Hood, an animated series developed by Cinar and Hanna-Barbera, tells a version of the story in which Robin (Voiced by Thor Bishopric) and his men, as well as Maid Marian, are teenagers.  This version also incorporates several fantasy elements.  For example, Robin is sometimes assisted by a forest-dwelling old woman who knows magic.
1991: The Ren and Stimpy Show episode Robin Höek from the first season had Ren Höek and Stimpy recreate the story of Robin Hood with Ren as Robin Hood and Stimpy as everyone else. Though it was a story Stimpy read, it ended as a nightmare for Ren.
2001: Robin Hood and his merry men have a brief cameo in the first episode of Cartoon Network's Samurai Jack as Jacks mentors when he visits England during his training.
2005: King Arthur's Disasters, a British animated series features Robin Hood who rivals Arthur.
2008: an episode of the Canadian-American children's TV series, The Backyardigans released the episode, "Robin Hood the Clean". hows Pablo the Penguin assuming his own playful version of the character Robin Hood as he happily works to clean up the village of Filthingham.
 2012: VeggieTales: Robin Good and His Not-So-Merry Men features a version of the legend featured as the titular segment. This version featured Larry the Cucumber as the title character (Robin Hood), Jimmy Gourd as Little John, Archibald Asparagus as Friar Cluck (Friar Tuck), Mr. Lunt as Bill Scarlet, Bob the Tomato as the Sheriff of Bethlingham (Sheriff of Nottingham), and Mr. Nezzer as Prince John.
2013: In Ever After High, the son of Robin Hood, Sparrow Hood, appears. He has a band called The Merry Men, sons of the Merry mens.
2019: Sherwood is an American computer animated science fiction web television series created by Diana Manson and Megan Laughton that premiered on March 6, 2019, on YouTube Premium. It is a new telling of the Robin Hood legend.

Robin Hood-themed non-English language films and television series
Live-action theatrical features
1960: Robin Hood and the Pirates (Robin Hood e i pirati), an Italian film with Lex Barker as Robin Hood.
1962: The Triumph of Robin Hood, an Italian film with Don Burnett as Robin Hood and Samson Burke as Little John.
1962: Sakhi Robin, an Indian Hindi-language drama film by B. J. Patel, starring Rajan Kapoor as the outlaw and Shalini as Maid Marian.
1965: Adventure of Robin Hood and Bandits, an Indian Hindi-language film again by B.J. Patel, starring Prashant as Robin Hood, Parveen Choudhary as Maid Marian, Shyam Kumar as Prince John, Saudagar Singh as Little John, Lord Jambal as Sheriff of Nottingham, and Nilofer as Christabel - the fiancée of Alan-a-Dale.
1970: Robin Hood, el arquero invencible a Spanish/Italian co-production with Carlos Quiney as Robin Hood
1971 : L'Arciere di fuoco (known under the English-language titles Long live Robin Hood and The Scalawag Bunch), an Italian film starring Giuliano Gemma as Robin Hood.
1975: The Arrows of Robin Hood (Strely Robin Guda, Стрелы Робин Гуда), a Soviet adaptation in Russian by Sergey Tarasov, starring Boris Khmelnitsky as Robin Hood, with songs of Vladimir Vysotsky.
1983: The Ballad of the Valiant Knight Ivanhoe (Ballada O Doblestnom Rytsare Ayvengo, Баллада о доблестном рыцаре Айвенго), a Russian adaptation of Sir Walter Scott's Ivanhoe by Sergey Tarasov, with songs of Vladimir Vysotsky, starring Boris Khmelnitsky as Robin Hood, who helps Ivanhoe to restore Richard's kingdom.
1986: Superfantozzi, an Italian film, the fifth of the Fantozzi comedy film series. Directed by Neri Parenti, it stars Paolo Villaggio as several incarnations of the character Ugo Fantozzi during the whole history of humanity. In one segment set in medieval England, a poor Fantozzi is given a large sum of gold from Robin Hood (played by Luc Merenda), only to be robbed minutes later by Robin himself because that gold made him rich.
1988: Aaj Ka Robin Hood (Translation: Today's Robin Hood) is a 1988 adventure-drama Indian Hindi film directed and produced by Tapan Sinha. It stars Anil Chatterjee, Utpal Dutt, Nana Patekar, Rabi Ghosh and Satish Shah in lead roles. 
1990: Xuxa e os Trapalhões em O Mistério de Robin Hood (English: Xuxa and the Bumbling in The Mystery of Robin Hood) is a 1990 Brazilian comedy-adventure film, directed by José Alvarenga Júnior. The film is starring Xuxa Meneghel and Os Trapalhões.
2012: Robin Hood: Ghosts of Sherwood, a German/US international co-production.

Live-action television films
1966: Robin Hood der edle Räuber, a German TV-film (2 parts) with Hans von Borsody as Robin Hood

Live-action television series
2008: Catch Me Now, a Chinese TV series, with modern settings
2016: Alyas Robin Hood, a Philippine primetime series produced by GMA Network.

Parodies, theatrical films
1966: Beware of the car updates the legend to modern Russia, with Innokenty Smoktunovsky playing a taxi driver turned car thief who gives the stolen money to orphanages.
1968: About Seven Brothers (Noin seitsemän veljestä) is a Finnish loose-based parody of the Robin Hood story, directed by Jukka Virtanen, and written, produced and starred by Spede Pasanen.

Parodies, short films
2004: Nottingham 2051. Year 2051. Robin Hood and Little John want to deliver "essential pharmacies" in the third world. Robin Hood is played by Tiziano Scrocca. Italian production

Parodies, theatrical films
1985:Naan Sigappu Manithan is a Tamil-language action thriller film directed by S. A. Chandrasekhar. 
1985:Nyayam Meere Cheppali is a Telugu film starring Suman and Jayasudha in the lead roles
 2008: Iljimae, a South Korean television drama series, based on a Chinese folklore from the Ming dynasty about a masked Robin Hood-esque character during the Joseon era.
 2009: The Return of Iljimae, a South Korean television drama series, based on comic strip Iljimae, published between 1975 and 1977, by Ko Woo-yung which was based on a Chinese folklore from the Ming dynasty about a masked Robin Hood-esque character during the Joseon era.
2015: Kamen Rider Ghost can access a green archer form called Robin Hood Damashii which is accessed by the ghost of Robin Hood himself. Robin Hood's spirit also helps Kamen Rider Ghost/Takeru Tenkuuji on his journey to unite the 15 Legendary Heroic Souls.

Animated features
1970: Brave Robin Hood a Soviet stop-motion animated film of a film studio "Soyuzmultfilm" which was created by the director Anatoliy Karanovich on Evgeny Agranovich's verses performed by Mikhail Ziv.

Animated TV series
1990–1992: Robin Hood (Robin Hood no Daibōken), a Japanese animated series developed by Tatsunoko Productions, tells a version of the story in which Robin (Voiced by Kazue Ikura) and his men (and women), as well as Maid Marian, are – in majority – children. This version also incorporates several fantasy elements, mainly expressed in mystic powers of the nature and a powerful treasure protected by the forest Sherwood itself. The whole series contains strong environmental messages as well as morals relating to real life.
1994: Keroppi The Sanrio anime Keroppi (Kero Kero Keroppi) has a Robin Hood episode, in which the cast reenacts the legend.
1997: In an episode of Cutey Honey Flash anime, one of the forms Honey takes in that episode is Robin Hood Honey.
2013: Robin Hood: Mischief in Sherwood, an Indian-French CGI animated series produced by Method Animation and DQ Enternainement. Shows a children's version of Robin Hood.
2018: Robin Hood is featured as a servant summoned from the past to fight in a Holy Grail War in the anime series Fate/Extra Last Encore'', a part of the Fate/Stay Night franchise created by Kinoko Nasu.

References

 
 
Lists of films and television series
Robin Hood